The Fløibanen is a funicular railway in the Norwegian city of Bergen. It connects the city centre with the mountain of Fløyen, with its mountain walks and magnificent views of the city. It is one of Bergen's major tourist attractions and one of Norway's most visited attractions. The line is owned by Fløibanen AS, a company with a number of shareholders, the biggest being the municipality of Bergen.

History 

The idea to build a line to Fløyen was put forward in 1895 by John Lund, a local resident and member of the Norwegian legislature. Permission was granted by the city council, but the project was shelved after the necessary capital failed to be raised. A further proposal was put forward in 1907 and the company Fløibanen AS was founded to construct and operate the line in 1912. The line was modelled after other funicular railways in Germany, Switzerland and Italy, the design being most similar to that of the Merkur funicular in Baden-Baden.

Work to build the line started in the autumn of 1914, with the expectation that construction would take from 12 to 18 months. However, with the cars being built by Maschinenfabrik Esslingen in Germany, and the rails being supplied from Switzerland, shortages caused by the outbreak of World War I delayed the work, and the Fløibanen was not officially opened until 15 January 1918. The drivers on the cars communicated with the operator by using a pole to strike a signal wire suspended over the line.

During World War II, the German occupying forces constructed many bunkers and other defensive features on the Fløyen mountain. The funicular was used to transport supplies and personnel, causing wear and tear to the cars and infrastructure. After the occupation ended, the two cars were first painted in contrasting colours from the Norwegian flag, with one car in red and the other in blue, a policy that has continued to this day. In 1954 the original cars were replaced with new cars supplied by Von Roll (underframes) and Hønefoss Karosserifabrikk (bodies). These cars accommodated 80 passengers, and the line was operated by drivers on each car, with no need for an operator at Fløyen.

In 1974, the cars on the line were again replaced, with the new cars supplied by Von Roll and also able to carry 80 passengers. In 1987, the electric motor was replaced with a new  one, whilst at the same time the brakes and electrical systems were replaced. In 1997, the lower terminus was refurbished and extended. Between September and November 2002, a fourth generation of car was introduced to the line, built by Doppelmayr (underframes) and Gangloff (bodies). These cars are capable of carrying 100 passengers and equipped with bigger windows and glass roofs.

Operation 

The line is single track with a central passing loop. The lower terminal and first  of the line is in tunnel, and there is a short tunnel above the passing loop, but the rest of the line is in the open air. The track is of  gauge and the gradient varies between 15 and 26 degrees.

There are two cars, each of which can carry 100 passengers and weighs 11 tonnes empty or 19 tonnes when fully loaded. The cars have a stepped floor, large windows and a glass roof, in order to maximise visibility of the view whilst in transit. The cars are individually named and painted, with Blåmann in blue and Rødhette (Little Red Riding Hood) in red. Each car is operated by a driver, who occupies a cabin at the uphill end of the car irrespective of direction of travel.

The drivers remotely control the speed of the cable, which is powered by a  electric motor and slowed by redundant braking systems, all located at the upper terminus. In the unlikely event of the cable breaking, the loss of cable tension would automatically cause track gripper brakes on each car to be deployed to bring them to a standstill.

The line runs every day from early morning to late evening. In the early morning and late evening, departures are half-hourly, increasing to quarter-hourly during the day and more frequently at times of high demand. Two departures an hour stop at the intermediate stops, with other journeys running non-stop. Depending on speed and stops, the journey takes between 5 and 8 minutes.

The line has a staffed ticket office at its lower terminus, and self-service ticket machines at all stops. Tickets can also be bought online, and either printed out or presented on a mobile device screen. Ticket barriers are in place at all stations, and tickets must be optically scanned to gain access to the platforms.

The stepped floor of each car matches up with the line's stepped platforms, with four doors on each side. Wheelchairs and strollers/buggies are carried on the level of the car accessed through the uppermost door, and can board and exit at the terminal stations only. The facilities at the summit are also accessible, and a selection of the mountain trails are usable.

Stops 
The following points are served:

See also 

 List of funicular railways
 Rail transport in Norway

References

External links

Fløibanen's official website
Fløibanen web cam

Funicular railways in Norway
Metre gauge railways in Norway
Transport in Bergen
Companies based in Bergen
Railway lines opened in 1918
1918 establishments in Norway
Tourist attractions in Bergen